Aplysia argus is a species of gastropod mollusc in the genus Aplysia, native to the Indo-Pacific region.

Description
This species has long been confused with Aplysia dactylomela (living in the Atlantic Ocean) because they are morphologically very similar, but genetic studies have shown that those found in the Indo-Pacific are indeed a distinct species

References

External links
 
 
 

argus
Gastropods described in 1863